Maja Klepić Jokanović (born 23 May 1988) is an alpine skier from Bosnia and Herzegovina.  She competed as Maja Klepić for Bosnia and Herzegovina at the 2010 Winter Olympics.  Her best result was a 52nd place in the giant slalom

References

External links
 
 
 

1988 births
Living people
Bosnia and Herzegovina female alpine skiers
Olympic alpine skiers of Bosnia and Herzegovina
Alpine skiers at the 2010 Winter Olympics
Serbs of Bosnia and Herzegovina